Herpetosiphonaceae is a family of bacteria in the order Herpetosiphonales.

References

External links

Phototrophic bacteria
Chloroflexota